The 1931 Major League Baseball season was contested from April 14 to October 10, 1931. The St. Louis Cardinals and Philadelphia Athletics were the regular season champions of the National League and American League, respectively. In a rematch of the prior year's postseason, the Cardinals then defeated the Athletics in the World Series, four games to three.

This was the first season that the Baseball Writers' Association of America (BBWAA) selected a Most Valuable Player in each league.

MLB statistical leaders

Standings

American League

National League

Postseason

Bracket

Managers

American League

National League

Home Field Attendance

Events
July 12 – the Chicago Cubs—St. Louis doubleheader has 33 doubles. Due to the large crowd spilling onto the field, any ball hit into them is a ground-rule double.
August 29 – Facing Cincinnati Reds pitcher Si Johnson in his second at bat in the major leagues, Chicago Cubs player Billy Herman hits Johnson's pitch, which ricochets off the bat and hits Herman in the head, knocking him out.

References

External links
1931 Major League Baseball season schedule at Baseball Reference

 
Major League Baseball seasons